Festuca beckeri is a species of grass which can be found in Central and Western Asia, and also in Europe.

Description
They are also clumped and have light brown coloured butt sheaths. The ligule is going around the eciliate membrane with the leaf sheaths being open and hairy. Leaf-blades are filiform, conduplicate, light green in colour, and are  broad. They also have smooth surface and peduncle.

Spikelets are elliptic and solitary with pedicelled fertile spikelets that carry 4-6 fertile florets. The main panicle branches are hairy. The glumes are chartaceous, lanceolate, and keelless. They also have acute apexes, while only the upper glume is sized . Flowers have three stamens while the fruits are caryopses with an additional pericarp and linear hilum.

References

beckeri
Flora of Central Asia
Flora of Western Asia
Flora of Europe